Cristevão Moniz Fernandes (born 16 January 2004), is an East Timorese international footballer who plays as a midfielder for SLB Laulara.

Career statistics

International

References

2004 births
Living people
People from Dili
East Timorese footballers
Timor-Leste international footballers
Association football midfielders
Competitors at the 2021 Southeast Asian Games
Southeast Asian Games competitors for East Timor